Bank Indonesia Museum is a bank museum located in Surabaya, Indonesia. It was officially founded by Bank Indonesia and was opened on 27 January 2012 after its restoration. The museum occupies a building formerly known as De Javasche Bank, the central bank of Dutch East Indies. After the Indonesian Independence the building continued to function as the Bank Indonesia's branch in Surabaya until 1973. The museum is closed on Monday and public holidays. It has no entrance fee.

History 
De Javasche Bank opened a branch in Surabaya on 14 September 1829. By 1904 the original building that occupied the plot was demolished and was rebuilt with an area of 1,000 square metres. It was designed in a similar manner to De Javasche Bank headquarter in Batavia, with Neo-Renaissance architecture and Javanese adornment.

The museum 
The museum has 3 floors and displays the history of the banking system in Indonesia, old photos of Surabaya and old currencies. The museum display is divided into 3 rooms:

Collection of old currencies Room - The room formerly functioned as safe deposit room and is used to display old currencies of Indonesia.
Collection from conservation Room - The room contains building materials which were replaced for the conservation, as well history of the bank's construction.
Collection of cultural treasure Room - The room displays old bank machinery and equipment.

Gallery

See also 

List of museums and cultural institutions in Indonesia
Museum Bank Indonesia, Jakarta

References 

Buildings and structures in Surabaya
Tourist attractions in East Java
Museums in East Java
Bank museums